J&L Tunnel is a tunnel on CSX Transportation's Pittsburgh Subdivision, at the former location of Jones and Laughlin Steel Company (now the SouthSide Works).

The tunnel was used to allow trains on the Pittsburgh and Lake Erie Railroad to bypass the Jones and Laughlin steel mill, by passing under it.

Starting in 2011, work was performed, as part of CSX Transportation's National Gateway project, to raise the clearance inside the tunnel, allowing double-stacked container trains to pass through the tunnel.

Above the tunnel is a small park called Tunnel Park.

References

External links
 South Side Works Tunnel at pghbridges.com
 Document containing information about the tunnel on page 19 from the National Gateway project

Railroad tunnels in Pennsylvania